Events from the year 1775 in Scotland.

Incumbents

Law officers 
 Lord Advocate – James Montgomery; then Henry Dundas; 
 Solicitor General for Scotland – Henry Dundas; then Alexander Murray

Judiciary 
 Lord President of the Court of Session – Lord Arniston, the younger
 Lord Justice General – Duke of Queensberry
 Lord Justice Clerk – Lord Barskimming

Events 
 Colliers and Salters (Scotland) Act 1775 provides for gradual removal of conditions of servitude on coal miners.
 The power of the burgh of Stirling to manage its own affairs is suspended when the Black Bond comes to light.
 Village of Tomintoul laid out by Alexander Gordon, 4th Duke of Gordon.
 John Howie's Biographia Scoticana is published.
 Samuel Johnson's A Journey to the Western Islands of Scotland is published.

Births 
 12 March – Henry Eckford, shipbuilder in New York (died 1832 in Constantinople)
 30 April – George Kinloch, radical politician (died 1833 in London)
 8 September – John Leyden, orientalist (died 1811 in Java)
 9 October – Sir Alexander Boswell, 1st Baronet, politician, poet, songwriter and antiquary (killed in duel 1822)
 26 October – Alexander Thom, military surgeon, judge and politician (died 1858 in Canada)
 13 November – John Burns, surgeon (drowned 1850)
 14 December – Thomas Cochrane, 10th Earl of Dundonald, admiral (died 1860 in London)

Deaths 
 17 June – John Pitcairn, major in the marines (born 1722; killed in Battle of Bunker Hill)
 18 November – Robert Forbes, Episcopal Bishop of Ross and Caithness (born 1708)
 28 December – John Campbell, author (born 1708)

See also 

Timeline of Scottish history

References 

 
Years of the 18th century in Scotland
Scotland
1770s in Scotland